Sutterella stercoricanis is a Gram-negative, oxidase- and catalase-negative, anaerobic and microaerophilic, non-spore-forming, rod-shaped bacterium from the genus Sutterella in the family of Sutterellaceae, which was isolated from dog faeces.

References

External links
Type strain of Sutterella stercoricanis at BacDive -  the Bacterial Diversity Metadatabase

Burkholderiales
Bacteria described in 2004